Norbert De Naeghel (born 29 November 1949) is a former Belgian footballer who played as defender.

Honours 

 Club Brugge KV
Belgian First Division: 1972–73, 1975–76, 1976–77
 Belgian Cup: 1969–70, 1976–77
 UEFA Cup: 1975-76 (runner-up)
 Jules Pappaert Cup: 1972

References 

Belgian footballers
1949 births
Living people
Association football defenders
Club Brugge KV players